Melissa Hayden is a professional poker player.

As of 2016, Hayden's live tournament winnings exceed $850,000.  Her biggest return to date was at the 2000 World Series of Poker limit Texas hold 'em event, where she finished in second place, winning $142,000. She placed fifth in the WPT Ladies' Night V Tournament at the Bicycle Casino in Bell Gardens, California, on September 1, 2007.  Hayden once beat world champion Stu Ungar in a $5,000 heads-up match in what is believed to have been his final poker game before dying days later.

Hayden resides in Las Vegas with her boyfriend, Allen Cunningham.

Notes 

Female poker players
Living people
American poker players
People from Brooklyn
Year of birth missing (living people)